The 1975 season of the Torneo Descentralizado, the top category of Peruvian football, was played by 18 teams. The top six qualified to the final group stage. As the First Division was reduced to 16 teams for 1976, no team was promoted and two teams were relegated. The criteria for relegation: Grau as the last placed team; Unión Tumán as the worst team from a Department (Lambayeque) with two teams (the other was Juan Aurich). This rule didn't apply for Lima clubs. A playoff match for 2nd place (qualifying for the Copa Libertadores) was necessary. The national champions were Alianza Lima.

Teams

Results

First round

Final group

Second place play-off

Title

External links
Peru 1975 season at RSSSF
Peruvian Football League News 

Peruvian Primera División seasons
Peru
Primera Division Peruana